The Elkon mine is a large open pit mine in the eastern part of Russia in Sakha Republic. Elkon represents one of the largest uranium reserves in Russia having estimated reserves of 219.2 million tonnes of ore grading 0.15% uranium.

See also 
 List of mines in Russia

References 

Uranium mines in Russia
Geography of the Sakha Republic